Domenic Priore (born January 15th 1960) is an American author, historian and television producer whose focus is on popular music and its attendant youth culture.

Biography
He has written extensively about The Beach Boys' Smile album, including two books on the subject, Look! Listen! Smile! Vibrate! and Smile: The Story of Brian Wilson's Lost Masterpiece. In 2011, he contributed to the liner notes of The Smile Sessions compilation. He has also published a number of books and articles on the greater Los Angeles area's youth culture during the 1960s, with special focus on the surf craze and the Sunset Strip music scene.

Priore worked as the primary writer and creative consultant on the AMC documentaries Hollywood Rocks the Movies: The Early Years (1955–1970) and Hollywood Rocks the Movies: The 1970s.

Publications

Filmography
Hollywood Rocks the Movies: The Early Years (1955–1970) (2000, hosted by Ringo Starr)
Hollywood Rocks the Movies: The 1970s (2002, hosted by David Bowie)

References

1960 births
Living people
American biographers
American music critics
Television producers from California
Writers from Pasadena, California